Calibretto 13 (later, simply Calibretto) was a Christian folk punk band from Kokomo, Indiana, United States. The acoustic punk style of the band and the peculiar vocal style of singer Joe Whiteford gives the band their signature sound. Another trademark is their lyrics, which often concerned B-movies and problems in pop culture and Christianity. The band also incorporated influences from folk music.

History as Calibretto 13
The trio of Joseph Whiteford (guitar and vocals), Aaron Richardson (bass) and Christopher Thomas (drums) came together in 1998 and released Sibling Rivalry, a split album with No More Droids, in 1999.  In 2000 the band put out Enter the Danger Brigade with Tooth and Nail Records. After the band's initial recording sessions for the album, Tooth & Nail thought that some of the submitted songs were too questionable in content and asked the band to reconvene with producer Barry Poynter and record several more. Calibretto 13 recorded 19 songs for Enter the Danger Brigade, and only 11 songs were included on the debut album. Seven of the remaining songs were released as an EP titled From the Secret Files of the Danger Brigade (2000).  In the liner notes for From the Secret Files..., Chris Thomas wrote: "[the songs] were kept from being on the album for one reason or another, and because we consider some of these to be our best songs we tried to make sure that you got to hear them.  Of course, some of these songs are pretty crappy, too." Calibretto 13 released a second full-length album on Tooth & Nail titled Adventures in Tokyo in 2002. This was the band's final release on Tooth & Nail.  After the release of Adventures in Tokyo, the band made several changes.

The remaining song from the Enter the Danger Brigade recording sessions, which was not on From the Secret Files of the Danger Brigade, is titled "Uncle Sam".  It was, however, available for download off of the Calibretto website for a short time, along with many other demos, live, and rare tracks.  With Joe Whiteford's permission, the rarities have been made available through the link below.  Oddly enough, an image of Uncle Sam, which was later used by Calibretto on merchandise, was included in the interior art of From the Secret Files of the Danger Brigade, despite the song not being present.

Name change to Calibretto
The name change from Calibretto 13 to Calibretto marked a significant change. The band left Tooth & Nail and moved to Standard Recording Company. They had already begun work on what would have been their third Tooth & Nail record, a full-length release entitled Making the World a Place. A fair amount of merchandise had been printed bearing this title, although it was never released. Songs intended for this record would end up on later Calibretto releases. According to posts on their message board, the band did sell CDs titled Making the World a Place in paper bags, although there was never any distribution of the record beyond that. Although retaining a similar sound, Calibretto's line-up changed.  Aaron Richardson left the band, and began to illustrate comics for Backburner Comics. Richardson's place was filled by Chad A. Serhal, formerly rhythm guitarist of In the face of war.  Calibretto released Dead by Dawn EP on Standard Recording Company in 2003. Whereas Calibretto 13 releases were aimed towards a Christian audience, the releases under the name Calibretto were not. Under the name Calibretto, the band had two releases, Dead by Dawn EP and a split release with Mercury Radio Theater titled All of These Things Do Not Belong, which was released in 2004. Calibretto played their final show on October 31, 2004, in their hometown of Kokomo.

In October, 2011, a new track entitled "I'm Dressing Up" was released on the Hope Can't Walk compilation.  The track was recorded at Decapolis Labs, and features Whiteford and Thomas at their usual stations; Richard returned to bass duties, and Serhal took up a second guitar. It is currently unknown if any further material will surface, or if anything more can be expected from the band in the future.

A number of members formerly involved in Calibretto went on to play in Harley Poe, Everything, Now!, Divebomber, and Encourager.

Band members
 Aaron Richardson – bass (currently artist for Backburner Comics, records at the Decapolis Recording Studio, and played on the Darling record Welcome the Ghost)
 Christopher Thomas – drums (formerly in Hello Hawk which formed out of Darling, was in Divebomber, now resides in Seattle)
 Joseph Whiteford – guitar, vocals (currently in Harley Poe)
 Chad A. Serhal – bass (currently in She Does Is Magic and a solo artist)
 While not an official member of the band, C. J. Sutton (In the face of war) played organ on Calibretto's releases on Standard Recording Company.

Discography

Calibretto 13/Calibretto
 Sibling Rivalry – (1998) Split release with No More Droids on RMC Records
 Enter the Danger Brigade – (2000) on Tooth and Nail Records
 From the Secret Files of the Danger Brigade (EP) – (2001) on Tooth and Nail Records
 Adventures in Tokyo – (2002) on Tooth and Nail Records
 Dead by Dawn (EP) – (2003) on Standard Recording Company
 All Of These Things Do Not Belong (2004) Split release with Mercury Radio Theater on Standard Recording Company

Related
 In The Dark (2005) on Standard Recording Company, the first record by Harley Poe, was performed by the members Calibretto

References

External links
 Standard Recording Co. Former official label website
 Calibretto 13 on Tooth & Nail alumni artists
 Short Bio on Calibretto
 Calibretto 13 Rarities Zip
 Calibretto 13 Discography
 Calibretto 13 Interview

Christian punk groups
Musical groups established in 1997
Musical groups disestablished in 2004
Punk rock groups from Indiana
Tooth & Nail Records artists